Protogygia whitesandsensis is a moth of the family Noctuidae. It is found in the White Sands National Park, Otero County, New Mexico.
The length of the forewings is 14–17 mm.

External links
The Lepidoptera of White Sands National Monument, Otero County, New Mexico, USA 1. Two new species of Noctuidae

Noctuinae